The Yehudi Menuhin International Competition for Young Violinists (or simply the Menuhin Competition) is an international music competition for violinists under the age of 22. It was founded by Yehudi Menuhin in 1983 with the goal of nurturing young violinists. In its early years, the competition took place in Folkestone on the south coast of England. Since 1998, it has been held biennially in different cities around the world. Several of the competition's past laureates, including Julia Fischer, Tasmin Little, and Nikolaj Znaider, have gone on to major international careers.

Competition 
A member of the European Union of Music Competitions for Youth (EMCY), the Menuhin Competition runs every two years, each time in a different city with the support of local sponsors. Recent competitions have been live-streamed on the Internet.
 
The competition is open to violinists of any nationality under the age of 22. The competitors are pre-selected by video recording and compete in three rounds during the actual competition. There is a required repertoire, which is chosen by the competition's organizers. However, the competitors also play a virtuoso violin work of their own choice as part of the semi-finals. In the first round, each competitor is also given a four to eight bar phrase on which to improvise for three minutes.

In later years the required repertoire and the gala concerts have included new works especially commissioned for the competition or works closely associated with the host country. At the 2010 Oslo competition, the previously required works by Paganini were replaced with works by the Norwegian violinist and composer Ole Bull to mark the bicentenary of his birth. The 2008 competition in Cardiff saw the world premiere of Welsh composer Mervyn Burtch's Elegy for King Arthur. The 2014 Austin, Texas competition included two world premieres of Texas-themed works: Donald Grantham's Black-eyed Suzy and Dan Welcher's The Cowboy and the Rattlesnake. The three commissioned works premiered at the 2016 London competition were John Rutter's Visions, Roxanna Panufnik's Hora Bessarabia and Òscar Colomina Bosch's Shpigl.

In the Senior category cash prizes are awarded to the top four places, while in the Junior category (under 16 years old) cash prizes are awarded to the top five places. There are also a number of individual cash prizes. These include the Bach Prize for the best performance of Johann Sebastian Bach's violin works, donated in memory of Robert Masters, the founding director of the Yehudi Menuhin School. The First Prize winner in the Senior category also receives a one-year loan of a "golden age" Stradivarius violin. The First Prize winner of the Junior category receives a one-year loan of a "fine old Italian violin".

The 2016 competition had 44 competitors—37 girls and seven boys. The top four prizes in the Senior category were won by young violinists from China, South Korea, and Taiwan. The top prize-winners in the Junior category were from the United States, South Korea, Sweden, and Germany.

History 

The competition was founded by Yehudi Menuhin and Robert Masters, who had been instrumental in the founding of the Yehudi Menuhin School. The competition took place for the first time in 1983 at Folkestone on the south coast of England and was based there for its first 15 years with Menuhin himself conducting master classes for the competitors. Following a three-year gap after the 1995 competition, it resumed in 1998 at Boulogne-sur-Mer on the French side of the English Channel and returned to Folkestone in 2000. At the inauguration of the first competition, Yehudi Menuhin said:

After Menuhin's death, the pianist Gordon Back, who had been the competition's accompanist since its founding, took over the Artistic Directorship of the competition, expanding the program into a festival format with the competition taking place amidst concerts, master classes, and education and outreach events. The competition also began moving its venue to a different international city each time. From 2002 to 2014, the competition was held in:
Boulogne-sur-Mer, based at the École nationale de musique et de danse (2002) 
 London, based at the Royal Academy of Music (2004)
Boulogne-sur-Mer, based at the École nationale de musique et de danse (2006) 
 Cardiff, based at the Royal Welsh College of Music and Drama with its gala concerts held in St David's Hall (2008)
 Oslo, based at the Norwegian Academy of Music (2010)
  Beijing, based at China's Central Conservatory of Music (2012)
 Austin, Texas, based at the Sarah and Ernest Butler School of Music (2014)

In 2016, the 100th anniversary of Menuhin's birth, the competition returned to London, where once again it was based at the Royal Academy of Music, with its gala concerts held at the Royal Festival Hall. The 2018 competition was held in Geneva, Switzerland. The 2021 competition was held in Richmond, Virginia.

Organization 
The Menuhin Competition is operated by the Menuhin Competition Trust, a UK-registered charity. Its president is the Japanese violinist and conductor Joji Hattori. The trust also has close ties to the Menuhin family. Yehudi Menuhin's daughter Zamira Menuhin-Benthall is its Life Patron and his grandson Aaron Menuhin serves as one of the trustees.

The competition's artistic director is the pianist Gordon Back.

As of 2016, the chair of the jury is the American violinist Pamela Frank who has held the post since 2012. Past jury members have included Maxim Vengerov, Dong-Suk Kang, Arabella Steinbacher, Ray Chen, Jeremy Menuhin, Julia Fischer, and Tasmin Little.

Notable laureates 
 Past laureates who have gone on to international careers include:

 Jiafeng Chen (Senior category 2nd prize in 2008)
 Ray Chen (Junior category 3rd Prize, 2004 and Senior category 1st prize in 2008)
 Julia Fischer (Junior category 1st Prize in 1995)
 Ilya Gringolts (Junior category 6th Prize in 1995)
 Joji Hattori (Senior category 4th Prize in 1987 and Senior category 1st Prize, Bach Prize, and Audience Prize in 1989)
 Daishin Kashimoto (Junior category 1st Prize in 1993)
 Tasmin Little (Senior category 3rd Prize in 1983 and Senior category 2nd Prize in 1985)
 Lara St. John (Junior category 4th Prize in 1985)
 Nikolaj Znaider (Senior category 5th Prize and Audience Prize in 1991)

As both Erica Jeal (the Guardian's music critic) and Gordon Back (the competition's artistic director) pointed out, winning the First Prize is no guarantee of a major career, and sometimes those who have become internationally renowned were not First Prize winners.

Previous prize winners 
Prizes are awarded in two categories: Senior for violinists aged 16 to 21, and Junior for violinists under the age of 16. Violinists aged 15 are permitted to enter the Senior category if they wish. The Senior category awards cash prizes to the top four places, while the Junior category awards cash prizes to the top five places. (Prior to 2002, the competition also awarded 6th, and on occasion 7th, prizes in the Junior category.) As of 2016, the 1st prize in the Senior category was £10,000 and the 1st prize in the Junior category was £5,000. There are also a number of special prizes and awards. In 2018, for the first time in the competition's history, there was a joint 1st prize in the Junior category.

Senior category

 Other prizes

 2021: Audience Prize –  Maria Dueñas 

 2014: EMCY Prize –  Timothy Chooi
 2012: EMCY Prize –  Kenneth Renshaw
 2012: Bach Prize –  Gabriel Ng
 2012: Composer's Prize –  Victor Zeyu Li
 2010: Violin Prize –  Timothy Chooi
 2008: Bach Prize –  Evgeny Sviridov
 2006: Composer's Prize –  Samika Honda
 2006: Outstanding Performance in Semi-Finals –  Dragos Mihail Manza
 2006: Outstanding Performance in Semi-Finals –  Mathieu van Bellen
 2004: Chamber Music Award –  Anthony Sabberton
 2002: Composer's Prize –  Anna Savytska
 1995: Audience Prize –  Lisa Kim
 1995: President's Prize –  Lisa Kim +  Natalia Lomeiko
 1995: Bach Prize –  Zhanna Tonaganyan
 1993: Audience Prize –  Gabriela Demeterova
 1991: Bach Prize –  Qing Guo +  Eugeny Andrusenko
 1991: Senior 5th Prize –  Nikolaj Znaider
 1991: Audience Prize –  Nikolaj Znaider
 1989: Bach Prize –  Joji Hattori
 1989: Audience Prize –  Joji Hattori
 1987: Bach Prize –  Elisabeth Glass +  Zheng Qing
 1987: Audience Prize –  Elisa Barston
 1985: Bach Prize –  Xiao-Dong Wang
 1985: Tunnicliffe Prize –  Xiao-Dong Wang
 1985: Audience Prize –  Abigail Young
 1983: Bach Prize –  Leland Chen
 1983: Audience Prize –  Isabelle van Keulen
 1983: Senior 5th Prize –  Dorota Siuda
 1983: Senior 6th Prize –  Micha Sugiura

Junior category 

Other prizes

 2012: Composer's Prize –  Kevin Zhu
 2010: EMCY Prize –  Guro Kleven Hagen
 2008: Composer's Prize –  Yu-Ah Ok
 2002: Chairman's Special Prize –  Esther Kim
 1995: Junior 7th Prize –  Sally Cooper
 1991: Audience Prize –  Jennifer Koh
 1989: Audience Prize –  Livia Sohn
 1987: Audience Prize –  Suzy Whang
 1985: Audience Prize –  Scott St. John

See also 
 List of classical music competitions

Notes and references

External links 
 
 Official Menuhin Competition YouTube Channel

Violin competitions